Sommariva del Bosco is a comune (municipality) in the Province of Cuneo in the Italian region Piedmont, located about  south of Turin and about  northeast of Cuneo.

Sommariva del Bosco borders the following municipalities: Baldissero d'Alba, Caramagna Piemonte, Carmagnola, Cavallermaggiore, Ceresole Alba, Racconigi, Sanfrè, and Sommariva Perno.

Notable people 

 Noemi Procopio, forensic scientist

Twin towns — sister cities
Sommariva del Bosco is twinned with:

  Porteña, Argentina, since 1998

References

Cities and towns in Piedmont
Roero